Stephen M. McNamee (born 1942) is an American attorney and jurist serving as a senior United States district judge of the United States District Court for the District of Arizona.

Early life and education

Born in Cincinnati, Ohio, McNamee received a Bachelor of Arts degree from the University of Cincinnati in 1964 and a Master of Arts from the University of Arizona in 1967. He received a Juris Doctor from the University of Arizona College of Law in 1969.

Career 
He was an attorney in the Legal and Finance Department of the Florsheim Shoe Company from 1969 to 1971. He was an Assistant United States Attorney of the District of Arizona from 1971 to 1979. He was a Lecturer of the College of Business at the University of Arizona from 1975 to 1979. He was a First Assistant United States Attorney of District of Arizona in 1980. He was a Chief Assistant United States Attorney of District of Arizona from 1981 to 1985. He was the United States Attorney for the District of Arizona from 1985 to 1990.

McNamee was nominated by President George H. W. Bush on February 20, 1990, to a seat on the United States District Court for the District of Arizona vacated by Judge Charles Leach Hardy. He was confirmed by the United States Senate on May 11, 1990, and received his commission on June 4, 1990. He served as Chief Judge from 1999 to 2006. He assumed senior status on October 1, 2007.

References

Sources

1942 births
Living people
Assistant United States Attorneys
James E. Rogers College of Law alumni
Judges of the United States District Court for the District of Arizona
United States Attorneys for the District of Arizona
United States district court judges appointed by George H. W. Bush
20th-century American judges
University of Cincinnati alumni
University of Arizona alumni
21st-century American judges